Bronisław Baczko (13 June 1924 – 29 August 2016) was a Polish philosopher and historian of ideas. Together with Leszek Kołakowski, he was a leading figure in the Warsaw School of the history of ideas in the late 1950s and 1960s.

Prizes and honours 
 2011: Balzan Prize for his work on the Age of Enlightenment

References

1924 births
2016 deaths
20th-century Polish  philosophers
Polish anti-communists
Polish United Workers' Party members
Academic staff of the University of Warsaw